Dmytro Vasylyovych Prokopchuk (born 4 November 2000) is a Ukrainian professional footballer who plays as a left midfielder for Ukrainian club Mariupol.

Career

Kramatorsk
He made his professional debut playing for Kramatorsk on 18 August 2021 in the Ukrainian Cup match against Alians Lypova Dolyna.

References

External links
 
 

2000 births
Living people
Place of birth missing (living people)
Ukrainian footballers
Association football midfielders
FC Olimpik Donetsk players
FC Vorskla Poltava players
FC Mariupol players
FC Kramatorsk players
FC Yarud Mariupol players
Ukrainian First League players